Stilesboro is an unincorporated community in southern Bartow County, Georgia, United States.

History
A post office was established at Stilesboro in 1846, and remained in operation until it was discontinued in 1953. The community was named after William H. Stiles, an early settler.

The Georgia General Assembly incorporated Stilesboro as a town in 1866. The town's municipal charter was repealed in 1995.

Notes

Former municipalities in Georgia (U.S. state)
Unincorporated communities in Bartow County, Georgia
Unincorporated communities in Georgia (U.S. state)
Populated places disestablished in 1995